Gunnar Lúðvík Nelson (born 28 July 1988) is an Icelandic professional mixed martial artist, currently competing in the Welterweight division of the Ultimate Fighting Championship. He is a black belt in Brazilian Jiu-Jitsu, which was awarded by Renzo Gracie after impressive results at the 2009 IBJJF Pan-Ams and the 2009 ADCC Submission Wrestling World Championship. Nelson is a member of Mjölnir MMA in Iceland, and SBG Ireland.

Background

Early life
Gunnar was born on 28 July 1988, in Akureyri in the north side of Iceland but has lived in Reykjavík, the capital of Iceland, almost all his life from early childhood. He played football and ice hockey in his childhood years. At the age of 13, he started training in Gōjū-ryū Karate and won the Icelandic Juvenile Kumite Championship title in 2003, and again in 2004 and 2005. He took home medals in every karate tournament he participated in from 2003 to 2005. In 2005, he was chosen as Iceland's most promising up-and-coming karate talent of that year, when he was just 16. However, he gave up karate to train in Brazilian Jiu-Jitsu and grappling at age 17.
Gunnar's father, Haraldur Dean Nelson (aka Halli Nelson), is of Anglo-American and Icelandic descent. He is also Gunnar's manager. Gunnar's mother, Guðrún Hulda Gunnarsdóttir Nelson, is Icelandic. Gunnar has one sibling,  a sister named  María Dögg Nelson, born in 1992 in Reykjavík. María is an actress in their home country of Iceland.

Brazilian Jiu-Jitsu
Gunnar began grappling in 2006, receiving his Brazilian Jiu-Jitsu (BJJ) blue belt from Matt Thornton of Straight Blast Gym International. From the age of 17, he continued his tutelage primarily under John Kavanagh, one of Thornton's students. Gunnar first met Kavanagh during one of his BJJ seminars at Mjolnir, and the SBG Ireland owner would remain his head coach until this day. By 2008, Gunnar had already progressed far enough for Kavanagh to award him his brown belt, but with Kavanagh not being a black belt for more than six years at the time, he was unable to award Gunnar his own black belt under IBJJF rules. Gunnar subsequently spent a period at Renzo Gracie Academy in New York to advance rank to black belt. Shortly after his arrival, he had competed for their team in various competitions, winning a silver medal in the 2009 Mundials brown belt category. He also won gold at the 2009 Pan American Championship (Gi), along with gold and silver (open class) in the 2009 Pan American Championship (No-Gi). At the 2009 ADCC Submission Wrestling World Championship, Gunnar took 4th place in the absolute category where he defeated the much heavier and touted BJJ Black Belts Jeff Monson and David Avellan. Gracie had already seen enough, and awarded him his black belt after less than a year with his academy. In 2011, Gunnar was again offered a place in the ADCC Submission Wrestling World Championship and had a good run (though not bringing home any medals), defeating the then present and twofold European Champion and multiple Finnish champion Marko Helen and the Brazilian and American champion and former World Champion Bruno Frazzato.

Today, Gunnar is an instructor in his home club Mjolnir. He spends his time between there, SBG Ireland, Renzo Gracie Academy, and also SBG Mainline in Manchester.

Mixed martial arts career

Early career
In May 2007, Gunnar fought in mixed martial arts for the first time, in Copenhagen, Denmark. The fight was against Danish fighter John Olesen. The judges ruled the bout a draw.

Gunnar won five more fights in the 16 months following his debut, in Ireland, the United Kingdom and Denmark, before taking a break from the sport for almost two years. He returned at BAMMA 2: Roundhouses at the Roundhouse in February 2010 and defeated opponent Sam Elsdon via submission in the first round. He secured another first round victory in his next fight against Danny Mitchell at Cage Contender 6 in Manchester, England before returning to BAMMA later that year. His next appearance was at   BAMMA 4: Reid vs. Watson in September 2010 where he faced previously unbeaten British prospect Eugene Fadiora and won by submission in the first round. In February 2012, Gunnar returned to MMA with a first round armbar submission win over Ukrainian fighter Alexander Butenko at Cage Contender 12 in Dublin Ireland. In late 2012 Gunnar signed a multi-fight agreement with the UFC.

Ultimate Fighting Championship
Gunnar signed a multifight contract with the UFC in July 2012. He's the first fighter from Iceland to fight for the company.

Gunnar was expected to make his promotional debut against Pascal Krauss on September 29, 2012 at UFC on Fuel TV: Struve vs. Miocic. However, Krauss was forced out of the bout with an injury (Rich Attonito was shortly linked to fighting Gunnar but he had weight concerns and also pulled out) and Gunnar was expected to face DaMarques Johnson at a catchweight bout of 175 lb,
but his opponent could not make the required weight. The fight was contested at 183 lbs (Gunnar weighed in at 175 lbs). Gunnar submitted Johnson via rear-naked choke at the 3:34 mark of the first round.

Gunnar was expected to face Justin Edwards on February 16, 2013 at UFC on Fuel TV: Barão vs. McDonald. However, Edwards was forced to pull out of the bout citing an injury, and was replaced by returning veteran Jorge Santiago. Gunnar won the fight by unanimous decision (29–28, 29–28, and 30–27).

Gunnar was expected to face Mike Pyle on May 25, 2013 at UFC 160. However, Gunnar pulled out of the bout citing an injury and was replaced by Rick Story.

A year later Gunnar returned to the UFC and faced Omari Akhmedov on March 8, 2014 at UFC Fight Night 37. Gunnar won the fight via submission in the first round. The win also earned him his first Performance of the Night bonus award.

Gunnar was expected to face Ryan LaFlare on July 19, 2014 at UFC Fight Night 46. LaFlare suffered an injury and was replaced by Zak Cummings. Gunnar won the fight via second round rear-naked choke. The victory secured his second Performance of the Night bonus award.

Gunnar next faced Rick Story on October 4, 2014 in the main event at UFC Fight Night 53. Gunnar lost the fight via split decision.

Gunnar was expected to face John Hathaway on July 11, 2015 at UFC 189.  However, Hathaway pulled out of the bout on June 23 citing injury, and was replaced by Brandon Thatch. Gunnar won the fight by submission due to a rear naked choke in round one after dropping Thatch with a left-right hand combo.

Gunnar was briefly linked to a fight with Demian Maia on October 24, 2015 at UFC Fight Night 76, but the bout did not materialize for that event as Maia was sidelined with a staph infection on his left leg. The bout eventually took place on December 12, 2015 at UFC 194. Gunnar lost the one-sided fight via unanimous decision.

Gunnar faced Albert Tumenov on May 8, 2016 at UFC Fight Night 87. He won the fight via submission in the second round, and earned his third Performance of the Night bonus.

Gunnar was expected to face Dong Hyun Kim on November 19, 2016 at UFC Fight Night 99. However, on October 21, it was announced that Gunnar had pulled out due to an injury and the fight was off. Kim was rescheduled to face Tarec Saffiedine on December 30, 2016 at UFC 207.

Gunnar faced Alan Jouban on March 18, 2017 at UFC Fight Night 107. After rocking Jouban with a punch, Gunnar secured a guillotine choke to win by submission in the second round. He was awarded a Performance of the Night bonus.

Gunnar faced Santiago Ponzinibbio on July 16, 2017 at UFC Fight Night 113. He lost the fight by knockout in the first round. At the post-fight press conference, Gunnar claimed that Ponzinibbio poked him in the eye during one of the earlier exchange and caused him see double: "And I really should have said something because I was seeing double for the rest of the fight. He caught me with a shot that I didn’t really see." Ponzinibbio dismissed Gunnar's claim and stated, "I went there to knock him out and thank God it went as expected, I won by knockout. If (the eye poke) happened, of course it wasn’t intentional, but I watched the video again and didn’t see it."  After the fight, Gunnar appealed his loss, as the referee had failed to stop the fight due to eye pokes under the Unified Rules of MMA; his appeal was denied by UFC.

Gunnar was expected to face Neil Magny on May 27, 2018 at UFC Fight Night 130. However, it was reported on April 28, 2018 that he was pulled from the event due to knee injury.

Gunnar faced Alex Oliveira on December 8, 2018 at UFC 231. He won the fight via a rear-naked choke after opening a brutal cut with an elbow in round two.

Gunnar faced Leon Edwards on March 16, 2019 at UFC Fight Night 147. He lost the fight via split decision.

Gunnar was expected to face Thiago Alves on September 28, 2019 at UFC Fight Night 160. However, Alves pulled out of the fight in mid-September due to undisclosed injury, and he was replaced by Gilbert Burns.  He lost the fight via unanimous decision.

As the first fight of his new multi-fight contract, Gunnar was expected to return from extended hiatus and face Cláudio Silva on March 19, 2022 at UFC Fight Night 204. However, Silva pulled out in early March due to a knee injury and he was replaced by Takashi Sato. Gunnar won the fight via unanimous decision.

Nelson was scheduled to face Daniel Rodriguez on March 18, 2023, at UFC 286. However, Rodriguez withdrew from the event for undisclosed reasons and he was replaced by Bryan Barberena. Nelson won the fight via armbar submission in the first round. He was awarded a 'Performance of the Night' bonus for the finish.

View on mixed martial arts practices

Weight cutting 
Throughout his career, Gunnar has never engaged in extensive weight cutting. His training weight is around 175–176 pounds, necessitating only a 5–6 pound weight cut. He has been a big proponent of instituting strict rules against weight cutting, arguing that the practice is dangerous to the fighters and counterproductive to the UFC, as it leads to fights being cancelled or fought at catch weight.

Wraps and gloves 
Gunnar fights and spars without wraps on his hands and uses small gloves. He has said that he would fight without any gloves if it were possible. He maintains that minimal wraps and gloves give him a better feel of what he's doing with his hands. Wraps and gloves are intended to protect fighters' hands, but Gunnar notes that he has never broken his hands.

Personal life
Gunnar has two children, a son and a daughter. His son, Stígur, was born on May 30, 2014, whose mother is Icelandic artist, Auður Ómarsdóttir. Gunnar and his girlfriend Fransiska Bjork Hinriksdóttir have a daughter, who was born on October 31, 2019.

Championships and accomplishments

Mixed martial arts
Ultimate Fighting Championship
Performance of the Night (Five times) vs. Omari Akhmedov, Zak Cummings, Albert Tumenov Bryan Barberena and Alan Jouban
Most submission wins in UFC Welterweight division history (7)
Tied (Frank Mir) for seventh most submission wins in UFC history (8)
Highest significant strike accuracy in UFC Welterweight division history (60.5%)
Nordic MMA Awards - MMAviking.com
2012 Breakthrough Fighter of the Year
2015 Submission of the Year vs. Brandon Thatch
2018 Submission of the Year vs. Alex Oliveira

Grappling
North American Grappling Association
NAGA Middleweight Champion (One time)
International Brazilian Jiu-Jitsu Federation
2009 IBJJF World Jiu-Jitsu Championship Middleweight Brown Belt Gi Silver Medalist
2009 IBJJF Pan American Championship Middleweight Brown Belt Gi Gold Medalist
2009 IBJJF Pan American Championship Middleweight Black Belt No Gi Gold Medalist
2009 IBJJF Pan American Championship Absolute Black Belt No Gi Silver Medalist

Mixed martial arts record

|-
| Win
|align=center|19–5–1
|Bryan Barberena
|Submission (armbar)
|UFC 286
|
|align=center|1
|align=center|4:51
|London, England
|
|-
| Win
|align=center|18–5–1
|Takashi Sato
|Decision (unanimous) 
|UFC Fight Night: Volkov vs. Aspinall
|
|align=center|3
|align=center|5:00
|London, England
|
|-
|Loss
|align=center|17–5–1
|Gilbert Burns
|Decision (unanimous) 
|UFC Fight Night: Hermansson vs. Cannonier 
|
|align=center|3
|align=center|5:00
|Copenhagen, Denmark
|
|-
|Loss
|align=center|17–4–1
|Leon Edwards
|Decision (split)
|UFC Fight Night: Till vs. Masvidal
|
|align=center|3
|align=center|5:00
|London, England
|
|-
|Win
|align=center|17–3–1
|Alex Oliveira
|Submission (rear-naked choke)
|UFC 231 
|
|align=center|2
|align=center|4:17
|Toronto, Ontario, Canada
|  
|-
|Loss
|align=center|16–3–1
|Santiago Ponzinibbio
|KO (punches)
|UFC Fight Night: Nelson vs. Ponzinibbio 
|
|align=center|1
|align=center|1:22
|Glasgow, Scotland
|
|-
|Win
|align=center|16–2–1
|Alan Jouban
|Submission (guillotine choke)
|UFC Fight Night: Manuwa vs. Anderson
|
|align=center|2
|align=center|0:46
|London, England
|
|-
|Win
|align=center|15–2–1
|Albert Tumenov
|Submission (neck crank)
|UFC Fight Night: Overeem vs. Arlovski
|
|align=center|2
|align=center|3:15
|Rotterdam, Netherlands
|
|-
|Loss
|align=center|14–2–1
|Demian Maia
|Decision (unanimous)
|UFC 194
|
|align=center|3
|align=center|5:00
|Las Vegas, Nevada, United States
|   
|-
|Win
|align=center|14–1–1
|Brandon Thatch
|Submission (rear-naked choke)
|UFC 189 
|
|align=center|1
|align=center|2:54
|Las Vegas, Nevada, United States
|
|-
| Loss
| align=center| 13–1–1
| Rick Story
| Decision (split)
| UFC Fight Night: Nelson vs. Story
| 
| align=center| 5
| align=center| 5:00
| Stockholm, Sweden
| 
|-
| Win
| align=center| 13–0–1
| Zak Cummings
| Submission (rear-naked choke)
| UFC Fight Night: McGregor vs. Brandão
| 
| align=center| 2
| align=center| 4:48
| Dublin, Ireland
| 
|-
| Win
| align=center| 12–0–1
| Omari Akhmedov
| Submission (guillotine choke)
| UFC Fight Night: Gustafsson vs. Manuwa
| 
| align=center| 1
| align=center| 4:36
| London, England
| 
|-
| Win
| align=center| 11–0–1
| Jorge Santiago
| Decision (unanimous)
| UFC on Fuel TV: Barão vs. McDonald
| 
| align=center| 3
| align=center| 5:00
| London, England
| 
|-
| Win
| align=center| 10–0–1
| DaMarques Johnson
| Submission (rear-naked choke)
| UFC on Fuel TV: Struve vs. Miocic
| 
| align=center| 1
| align=center| 3:34
| Nottingham, England
| 
|-
| Win
| align=center| 9–0–1
| Alexander Butenko
| Submission (armbar)
| Cage Contender XII
| 
| align=center| 1
| align=center| 4:21
| Dublin, Ireland
| 
|-
| Win
| align=center| 8–0–1
| Eugene Fadiora
| Submission (neck crank)
| BAMMA 4
| 
| align=center| 1
| align=center| 3:51
| Birmingham, England
| 
|-
| Win
| align=center| 7–0–1
| Danny Mitchell
| Submission (rear-naked choke)
| Cage Contender VI
| 
| align=center| 1
| align=center| 2:51
| Manchester, England
| 
|-
| Win
| align=center| 6–0–1
| Sam Elsdon
| Submission (rear-naked choke)
| BAMMA 2
| 
| align=center| 1
| align=center| 2:30
| London, England
| 
|-
| Win
| align=center| 5–0–1
| Iran Mascarenhas
| KO (punch)
| Adrenaline 3: Evolution
| 
| align=center| 2
| align=center| 3:22
| Copenhagen, Denmark
| 
|-
| Win
| align=center| 4–0–1
| Barry Mairs
| TKO (punches)
| Angrrr Management 14: Ready for War
| 
| align=center| 1
| align=center| 3:38
| London, England
| 
|-
| Win
| align=center| 3–0–1
| Niek Tromp
| TKO (punches)
| Cage of Truth 1: Battle on the Bay
| 
| align=center| 1
| align=center| 1:50
| Dublin, Ireland
| 
|-
| Win
| align=center| 2–0–1
| Adam Slawinski
| TKO (punches)
| Ultimate Fighting Revolution 10   	
| 
| align=center| 1
| align=center| 2:30
| Galway, Ireland
| 
|-
| Win
| align=center| 1–0–1
| Driss El Bakara
| Submission (armbar)
| Cage Rage Contenders: Dynamite	 	
| 
| align=center| 1
| align=center| 3:46
| Dublin, Ireland
| 
|-
| Draw
| align=center| 0–0–1
| John Olesen
| Draw (split)
| Adrenaline Sports tournament
| 
| align=center| 3
| align=center| 5:00
| Copenhagen, Denmark
|

Grappling record
{| class="wikitable sortable" style="font-size:80%; text-align:left;"
|-
| colspan=8 style="text-align:center;" | 14 Matches, 8 Wins (4 Submissions), 6 Losses (1 Submission)
|-
!  Result
!  style="text-align:center;"| Rec.
!  Opponent
!  Method
!  Event
!  Division
!  Date
!  Location
|-
|Loss||style="text-align:center;"|8-6||  Alexandre Ribeiro|| Points || rowspan=4|ADCC World Championship || rowspan=2|Absolute|| rowspan=2| || rowspan=4| Nottingham
|-
|Win||style="text-align:center;"|8-5||  Bruno Frazzato|| Points
|-
|Loss||style="text-align:center;"|7-5||  André Galvão|| Points ||rowspan=2|-88 kg||rowspan=2 |
|-
|Win||style="text-align:center;"|7-4||  Marko Helen|| Points
|-
|Win||style="text-align:center;"|6-4||  Bjarni Kristjánsson || Submission (guillotine choke)||rowspan=2| Mjolnir Open ||rowspan=2|Absolute|| rowspan=2| ||rowspan=2| Reykjavík
|-
|Win||style="text-align:center;"|5-4||  Brynjólfur Ingvarsson || Submission (armbar)
|-
|Win||style="text-align:center;"|4-4||  Mike Russell|| Submission (rear naked choke) || Health & Fitness Expo ||Superfight||  || Reykjavík
|-
|Loss||style="text-align:center;"|3-4||  Azunna Anyanwu|| Points|| rowspan=2|Grapplers Quest: Beast of the East || rowspan=2|Absolute||  rowspan=2| || rowspan=2| Caldwell, NJ
|-
|Win||style="text-align:center;"|3-3||  Ronnie Mikvenski|| Points
|-
|Loss||style="text-align:center;"|2-3||  Vinny Magalhães|| Points || rowspan=5|ADCC World Championship || rowspan=4|Absolute|| rowspan=4| || rowspan=5| Barcelona
|-
|Loss||style="text-align:center;"|2-2||  Alexandre Ribeiro|| Submission (kneebar)
|-
|Win||style="text-align:center;"|2-1||  David Avellan|| Submission (rear naked choke)
|-
|Win||style="text-align:center;"|1-1||  Jeff Monson|| Points
|-
|Loss||style="text-align:center;"|0-1||  James Brasco|| Referee Decision ||-88 kg||

Instructor lineage 
Kano Jigoro → Tomita Tsunejiro → Mitsuyo Maeda → Carlos Gracie, Sr. → Helio Gracie → Rolls Gracie → Carlos Gracie, Jr. → Renzo Gracie → Gunnar Nelson

See also
 List of current UFC fighters
 List of male mixed martial artists

References

External links
 
 

1988 births
Gunnar Nelson
Gunnar Nelson
Gunnar Nelson
Gunnar Nelson
Gunnar Nelson
Mixed martial artists utilizing Gōjū-ryū
Mixed martial artists utilizing Brazilian jiu-jitsu
People awarded a black belt in Brazilian jiu-jitsu
Living people
Gunnar Nelson
Welterweight mixed martial artists
Ultimate Fighting Championship male fighters